Inverclyde Council is one of the 32 local authorities of Scotland, covering the Inverclyde council area. In its current form the council was created in 1996, replacing the previous Inverclyde District Council which existed from 1975 to 1996.

The council has been under no overall control since 2007, being led by a Labour minority administration. The council is based at the Municipal Buildings in Greenock, the area's largest town.

History
Prior to 1975 the area was the western part of the historic county of Renfrewshire. The Local Government (Scotland) Act 1973 replaced Scotland's counties, burghs and districts with a two-tier system comprising upper-tier regions and lower-tier districts. Inverclyde was created as one of nineteen districts within the Strathclyde region. Further reforms in 1996 under the Local Government etc. (Scotland) Act 1994 saw the Strathclyde Regional Council abolished and Inverclyde become a council area, taking over the former regional council's roles in the area.

In 2005, the council was criticised by the Accounts Commission for poor leadership and accountability. The chief executive resigned and various changes to the council's internal structures were made in response.

Until 2007, Inverclyde was the last authority in the United Kingdom not to have named its wards; whilst the local authority reserved its right to name wards, it did not to supply any names to the Local Government Boundary Commission. This was rectified in the 2006 review leading to the new wards used for the 2007 election, although the six multi-member wards created then used only vague geographical descriptions ('Inverclyde North', 'Inverclyde East', 'Inverclyde South West' etc.), in contrast to the majority of wards in Scotland.

Political control
The first election to Inverclyde District Council was held in 1974, initially operating as a shadow authority alongside the outgoing authorities until the new system came into force on 16 May 1975. A shadow authority was again elected in 1995 ahead of the reforms which came into force on 1 April 1996. Political control of the council since 1975 has been as follows:

Inverclyde District Council

Inverclyde Council

Leadership
The leaders of the council since 1996 have been:

Composition
Following the Council elections of 2022, the current composition of Inverclyde Council is:

The election resulted in no overall control of the council.

Premises
The council is based at the Municipal Buildings on Clyde Square in Greenock. The main building was built in 1886 for the former Greenock Town Council, although the complex also incorporates the earlier Greenock Town Hall of 1765. The buildings passed to Inverclyde District Council at the local government reorganisation in 1975, and then to Inverclyde Council when local government was reorganised again in 1996.

Elections
Since 2007 elections have been held every five years under the single transferable vote system, introduced by the Local Governance (Scotland) Act 2004. Election results since 1995 have been as follows:

Wards

Six multi-member wards (20 seats) were created for the 2007 election, replacing 20 single-member wards which had been in place since the 1980s. The representation was increased to 22 councillors across 7 seats for the 2017 election:

References

Politics of Inverclyde
Local authorities of Scotland
Organisations based in Inverclyde
Greenock